The Kanuti (Kkʼoonootnoʼ in Koyukon) is a  tributary of the Koyukuk River in the U.S. state of Alaska. The river begins near the Arctic Circle and flows generally west, passing under the Dalton Highway near Caribou Mountain.
The Kanuti National Wildlife Refuge covers a large part of the river basin.

See also
List of rivers of Alaska

References

Rivers of Alaska
Rivers of Yukon–Koyukuk Census Area, Alaska
Tributaries of the Yukon River
Rivers of Unorganized Borough, Alaska